Stomodes is a genus of broad-nosed weevils in the beetle family Curculionidae. There are about 11 described species in Stomodes.

Species
These 11 species belong to the genus Stomodes:
 Stomodes convexicollis Miller, 1881 c g
 Stomodes ganglbaueri Wagner, 1912 c g
 Stomodes gyrosicollis Boheman, 1843 i c g b
 Stomodes leonhardi H. Wagner, 1912 c g
 Stomodes letzneri Reitter, 1889 c g
 Stomodes marocanus Hoffmann, 1957 c g
 Stomodes muelleri Lona, 1922 c g
 Stomodes periteliformis Reitter, 1915 c g
 Stomodes puncticollis Tournier, 1864 c g
 Stomodes rotundicollis Frivaldszky, 1880 c g
 Stomodes tolutarius Schoenherr, 1826 c g
Data sources: i = ITIS, c = Catalogue of Life, g = GBIF, b = Bugguide.net

References

Further reading

 
 
 
 

Entiminae
Articles created by Qbugbot